Robert Cooley Elderfield (May 30, 1904 – December 10, 1979) was an American chemist. He was born in Niagara Falls, New York, United States.

He studied at the Choate School in Wallingford, Connecticut, later at the University of Michigan receiving his Ph.D. from the Massachusetts Institute of Technology in 1930. He worked at the Rockefeller Institute of Medical Research from 1930 till 1936 when he changed to Columbia University. He was moved to University of Michigan in 1952.

He started his research with cardiac glycosides and cardiac aglycones shifting to the synthesis of primaquine and other antimalarials; at the end he did some research in new anticancer agents

External links
Robert Elderfield's Biographical Memoir from the National Academy of Sciences

1904 births
1979 deaths
20th-century American chemists
People from Niagara Falls, New York
People from Wallingford, Connecticut
University of Michigan alumni
University of Michigan faculty
Scientists from New York (state)